Ashok Krishna Dutt was an Indian politician . He was elected to the Lok Sabha, lower house of the Parliament of India from Dum Dum in 1977 defeating Communist leader Indrajit Gupta. He was a Solicitor and Advocate and practiced in the Calcutta High Court. He was arrested under Maintenance of Internal Security Act during Emergency. He was elected to the West Bengal legislative assembly from Barasat constituency in 1962 defeating Forward Bloc leader Chitta Basu.

References

External links
 Official biographical sketch in Parliament of India website

1928 births
West Bengal MLAs 1962–1967
India MPs 1977–1979
Lok Sabha members from West Bengal
Living people
People from North 24 Parganas district
Janata Party politicians
Indian National Congress politicians